Friday Harbor Airport  is a public use airport located just southwest of the town center of Friday Harbor on San Juan Island in the U.S. state of Washington. It is owned by the Port of Friday Harbor.

Although most U.S. airports use the same three-letter location identifier for the FAA and IATA, this airport is assigned FHR by the FAA and FRD by the IATA.

It is included in the Federal Aviation Administration (FAA) National Plan of Integrated Airport Systems for 2019–2023, in which it is categorized as a non-hub primary commercial service facility.

Facilities and aircraft
 

In 2016, the airport had 44,840 aircraft operations, an average of 123 per day: 72% general aviation and 29% air taxi. In May 2020, there were 151 aircraft based at this airport: 138 single-engine, 7 multi-engine, and 6 helicopter.

Airlines and destinations

Passenger

Cargo

Statistics

Carrier shares

Top destinations

In popular culture 
Friday Harbor is the default starting location in the flight simulator Microsoft Flight Simulator X.

References

External links
 Port of Friday Harbor: Airport Section
 Friday Harbor Airport at Washington State DOT
 

Airports in Washington (state)
Airports in San Juan County, Washington
Friday Harbor, Washington